John Oakes (13 September 1905 – 20 March 1992), was an English footballer who played as a centre half in the Football League.

He was on the losing side for Charlton Athletic in the 1946 FA Cup Final, and turned out for Nottingham Forest, Southend United and Aldershot before joining the Addicks in 1936.

He did not make the line-up for Charlton's victorious 1947 FA Cup Final, and signed for Plymouth Argyle soon after, spending one season at Home Park before retiring in his 43rd year.

After his playing career was over, he emigrated to Australia, and was living in the city of Perth by the time of his death in March 1992 at the age of 86.
Jack Oakes was a great-uncle of Roy Sandbach.

External links
Jack Oakes' Career

1905 births
1992 deaths
English footballers
People from Winsford
Association football defenders
Charlton Athletic F.C. players
Nottingham Forest F.C. players
Southend United F.C. players
Crook Town A.F.C. players
Spennymoor United F.C. players
Aldershot F.C. players
Plymouth Argyle F.C. players
English Football League players
Sportspeople from Cheshire
Brentford F.C. wartime guest players
FA Cup Final players